District is a district of the city of Guilin, Guangxi, China.

Xiangshan District is divided into 3 subdistricts and 1 township:

 Nanmen Subdistrict
 Xiangshan Subdistrict
 Pingshan Subdistrict
 Ertang Township

Tourist attractions
 Chongshan Street Mosque

References

County-level divisions of Guangxi
Administrative divisions of Guilin